The Battle of Kočevje was an encounter between the Slovene Partisans, the armed wing of the pro-Allies Liberation Front of the Slovene People and on the other hand the German occupying forces and the pro-Axis Slovene Home Guard in Operational Zone of the Adriatic Littoral during World War II.

Under the command of Mirko Bračič at midnight on 9 December 1943 the town of Kočevje (German: Gotschee) was attacked by three Slovene Partisans brigades. The attack was supported by the partisan artillery and mortars.

The Kočevje mine, student hostel, school and some other important buildings in the city were captured by the partisans. The remnants of the German-Home Guard garrison retreated into the Gotschee Castle where it remained protected by its thick walls until two German relief columns under the command of Oskar von Niedermayer came from Ljubljana and broke the partisan encirclement, rescuing the besieged German garrison on 12 December 1943.

References

Further reading
Stefano di Giusto (2002) Panzer in the OZAK 1943-1945. Edizioni della Laguna,  (containing photographs taken after the battle that are part of the collection of the Museum of contemporary history, Ljubljana).

Kočevje
Slovenia in World War II
Slovene Partisans
Kocevje
Yugoslavia in World War II
1943 in Yugoslavia
Kočevje
December 1943 events